Small Potatoes is an animated pre-school series written and directed by Josh Selig (creator of Oobi, Wonder Pets! and 3rd & Bird). It was produced by Little Airplane Productions from its second studio in London. The show features a group of four potatoes—Olaf, Ruby, Nate, and Chip—who sing songs. The show's music was composed by Jerry Bock.

27 shorts were produced. The series was aired on CBeebies in the UK, ABC Kids in Australia, and on the Disney Junior channel in the United States. It was followed by a motion picture in 2013, Meet the Small Potatoes. Small Potatoes is also available on BBC iPlayer for over a year.

Characters
Ruby: The smallest of the potatoes, who is red. She is the leader of the group.
Olaf: The biggest of the potatoes who is wide and dark brown.
Chip: A normal-sized light brown potato.
Nate: A long and skinny potato who is medium red-brown.

Episodes

Broadcast
The series is broadcast in the following countries:

  - Ketnet
  - ABC Kids
  - TV Brasil
  - DR
  - Piwi+
  - Super RTL
  - Rai Yoyo
  - TV Tokyo
  - RTP2
  - KidZone TV
  - Clan TVE
  - ThaiPBS
  - e-Junior
  - CBeebies
  - Disney Junior
  - Family Jr

Discography

Albums

Singles

DVD
2012 - Small Potatoes – The Complete Series

References

External links
 
 
 

2011 American television series debuts
2011 American television series endings
2010s American children's television series
2010s American animated television series
2011 British television series debuts
2011 British television series endings
2010s British children's television series
2010s British animated television series
American children's animated musical television series
American preschool education television series
British children's animated musical television series
British preschool education television series
Animated preschool education television series
2010s preschool education television series
English-language television shows
BBC children's television shows
Fictional tubers
Children's television characters
CBeebies